Theis Frydenlund Rasmussen (born 12 July 1984), known as Theis F. Rasmussen, is a Danish former professional footballer who played as a goalkeeper. He has played six games for the Denmark U-21 national team, and helped the team qualify for the UEFA U-21 Championship 2006.

He started his career with Danish 1st Division teams B.93 and Akademisk Boldklub. He moved to 1st Division rivals Vejle Boldklub in 2005, and helped Vejle win promotion for the Danish Superliga. When Vejle brought in experienced goalkeeper Jan Hoffmann, Rasmussen saw no more playing time, and left the club in the winter 2007. He continued his career as an amateur with BK Frem, but soon left for Superliga club FC Nordsjælland in March 2008. He left Nordsjælland in December 2008 in order to seek more playing time elsewhere. He joined 1st Division team Kolding FC in January 2009, but injuries forced him to leave the club in August 2009.

References

External links
 
 Danish Superliga statistics
  Vejle Boldklub profile

1984 births
Living people
Danish men's footballers
Association football goalkeepers
Denmark youth international footballers
Denmark under-21 international footballers
Boldklubben af 1893 players
Akademisk Boldklub players
Vejle Boldklub players
Boldklubben Frem players
FC Nordsjælland players
Kolding FC players
Danish Superliga players